"Straightenin" is a song by American hip hop trio Migos. It was released through Quality Control and Motown on May 14, 2021, as the second single from their fourth studio album, Culture III. Straightenin was the Migos last single to be released before the death of their member Takeoff the next year in 2022, as the group was disbanded all together.

Background
In March 2021, Quavo previewed the song's music video on social media. The track and the accompanying video were released on May 14, 2021 with an announcement of the album Culture III.

Hong Kong rapper and producer Big Spoon accused Migos of copying his 2020 song "Magic Show 魔術表演", which he compared to "Straightenin" in an Instagram video, saying, "I composed and produced the song by myself, did all the rapping, and played all the instruments so there are no samples or loops taken from elsewhere. I tweaked their song to the same tempo and key for comparison."

Composition
The song features "triplet flows and ad libs" quickly rapped over "booming bass, crisp percussion and a woozy synth line". Quavo mentions acting alongside Robert De Niro in the upcoming film Wash Me in the River ("I'm counting dineros with Robert DeNiro / He telling 'em that Cho amazing"), and also raps, "Turn a pandemic into a bandemic / You know that's the shit that we on". Takeoff then raps, before Offset raps the third verse with a "silky flow talking about his days spinning the block."

Critical reception
Althea Legaspi of Rolling Stone described the song as "classic Migos".

Music video
The official music video for "Straightening" premiered along with the song on May 14, 2021. It was directed by Keemotion. The Migos are joined by friends and expensive items, such as luxury cars and vehicles.

Personnel
Credits adapted from Tidal.

 Migos
 Quavo – vocals, songwriting
 Takeoff – vocals, songwriting
 Offset – vocals, songwriting
 DJ Durel – production, songwriting, programming
 Atake – production, songwriting, programming
 Sluzyyy – production, songwriting, programming
 Slime Castro – production, songwriting, programming
 Nuki – production, songwriting, programming
 Osiris – production, songwriting, programming
 Manny Marroquin – mixing, studio personnel
 Chris Galland – mixing, studio personnel
 Jeremie Inhaber – assistant mixing, studio personnel

Charts

Weekly charts

Year-end charts

Certifications

References

2021 singles
2021 songs
Migos songs
Songs written by Quavo
Songs written by Takeoff (rapper)
Songs written by Offset (rapper)
Motown singles